On 27 November 2022, 15 people were killed during an al-Shabaab attack at a hotel in Mogadishu, Somalia.

Background
In 2006, about 15 years after the Somali Civil War began, jihadist group al-Shabaab began an insurgency in an attempt to overthrow the Somali government and impose an extreme interpretation of Sharia. They often attack hotels; they have attacked the country's capital Mogadishu many times. The Islamist group's most deadly attack was a truck bombing in October 2017 which killed over 500 people, and their most recent attack was a double car bombing on 29 October 2022.

Attack
During the evening of 27 November 2022, six al-Shabaab insurgents – a suicide bomber and five gunmen – attacked the Villa Rosa hotel in central Mogadishu. The attack lasted over 12 hours, during which they killed eight civilians and a soldier. Somali security forces killed all five insurgents and rescued 60 civilians.

References

2022 murders in Somalia
2020s building bombings
2020s crimes in Mogadishu
21st-century mass murder in Somalia
Attacks on buildings and structures in 2022
Attacks on hotels in Somalia
Building bombings in Mogadishu
Hotel bombings
Mass murder in 2022
Mass murder in Mogadishu
November 2022 crimes
November 2022 events in Africa
Suicide bombings in 2022
Suicide bombings in Mogadishu
Terrorist incidents in Somalia in 2022